Musharraf Husain Khan (known as M H Khan; 1 February 1932 – 12 October 2018) was a Bangladesh Navy Rear Admiral who has served as the chief of the Bangladesh Navy from 7 November 1973 to 3 November 1979. During his tenure, Bangabandhu Sheikh Mujibur Rahman on December 10, 1974 commissioned Bangladesh Navy's largest training base BNS Issa Khan and also handed over “naval ensign” to Bangladesh Navy on the same day. Rear Admiral Musharraf Husain Khan was the 2nd Chief of Naval Staff of the Bangladesh Navy, the 1st being Commander Nurul Haq. Admiral M. H. Khan joined the Pakistan Navy in 1950. Upon selection as a Cadet into the Pakistan Navy, he was sent to the Royal Navy for training. In 1951 he entered Royal Naval College Dartmouth and after a few years of sea time on RN ships he subsequently, as a Sub Lieutenant was selected to attend the Royal Naval College, Greenwich in 1954. He served on several Royal Naval ships including the aircraft carrier HMS Eagle. He continued his career in the Pakistan Navy and was on a fast track where he achieved the rank of Captain and commanded several of the primary Naval Ships of the Pakistan Navy, including the cruiser PNS Babur and the flag ship destroyer PNS Khaibar. After the Bangladesh war of Independence, Admiral Khan was appointed as the 2nd Chief of the Bangladesh Navy in November 1973 by the Prime Minister Sheikh Mujibur Rahman. Admiral Khan created the Bangladesh Navy from scratch in very difficult circumstances but was able to create and implement the framework upon which the Bangladesh Navy has been built, following the scope and plan that he laid out in his six plus years as Naval Chief.

Family Background 
Admiral Khan’s was the second of four sons of his father Muazzam H. Khan, who was Director General of Pakistan Intelligence Bureau during the 1950’s, and his mother was Shafia Khan. The M. H. Khans are of Turkic and Persian ancestry having coming to India under the realm of Emperor Akbar. The family who are descendants of Shaista Khan, moved East from Lahore and Delhi and were awarded a pargana by Emperor Jahangir in what came to be called Noorpur in central East Bengal, about 60 miles SW of Dhaka. His great grandfather, Yasin Khan (died 1907) was the last occupant of this substantial estate, which was ravaged and destroyed by 19th century battles, and the earthquakes of 1897.

Early Life and Education 
Musharraf H. Khan was educated in several district schools of as his father Muazzam Khan, having joined the Imperial Police service was frequently moving between the several districts of Bengal. In 1947 Musharraf Khan was eager to join the Navy and commenced his Naval journey by joining as a cadet at the naval boarding ship school, Dufferin, located in Bombay (now Mumbai). He graduated in 1950 and then applied to join the Pakistan Navy.

Personal life 
Musharraf Khan married his wife Fahmida H. Khan in January 1961. Fahmida Khan’s great grandfather was Sir Abdul Majid of Assam and one of the first Indian to graduate from Cambridge University in 1891 in Law. Her grand uncle was Major General Ishfaqul Mazid, one of the first Indians to be commissioned at Royal Military College in Sandhurst in 1924. Admiral Khan and Fahmida Khan have only one child a son, who is Maruf H. Khan Noorpuri and he has two sons, Musavvir and Muazzam. Admiral Khan passed away in CMH Dhaka on 12 October 2018.

Naval career 
On completion of his sea time with the Royal Navy and his initial education and training at the Royal Naval Colleges Dartmouth and Greenwich he returned to the UK in 1957, where he received further training in the UK at HMS Dryad in advanced Navigation and Direction, which became his naval specialization. In 1964 he was further selected for training in the Atomic and Biological school located in Salisbury, England.

Musharraf H. Khan had an active and substantive Naval career with the Pakistan Navy. In addition to commanding several ships, he was also Controller of Pakistan Shipping in Karachi in 1967 on secondment from the Navy. On his return to the Pakistan Navy in 1969 he was given command of the PNS Babur, then the largest naval ship of the Pakistan Navy and subsequently command of the Flag ship destroyer Khaibar. Previously he saw active service in the 1965 Indo-Pak war when he was in command of the patrol craft squadron in the Arabian sea.

War of Independence 
Musharraf H. Khan and his family were interned as Prisoners of War in Karachi Naval base Karsaz, during and immediately after the war of independence.

After the War of Independence appointed as First Chief of the Naval Staff (CNS) of Bangladesh Navy 

On his return to Bangladesh, Bangabandhu Sheikh Mujibur Rahman, appointed him immediately as the first Naval Chief of the country in November 1973. Musharraf Khan created a master plan for the Navy and its growth for multiple decades. 50 years on, the Bangladesh Navy continues to follow that path. Under his stewardship, the Navy acquired its first frigates from the Royal Navy, BNS Umar Faruq (1976) and BNS Ali Haider (1979). Numerous foreign training opportunities were established for young Bangladesh Naval cadets, primarily in the UK and other European NATO countries. He was able to develop and build the current NHQ establishment (1976) in Dhaka and several of the shore establishments in Bangladesh, located in Dhaka, Chittagong, Kaptai, Khulna and Mongla.

Founder Chairman of NOAMI 
Rear Admiral Musharraf Husain Khan was the Founder Chairman (1978 to 1989) and Chief Advisor (1990 to 2018) of the National Oceanographic And Maritime Institute (NOAMI) and took a lot of pains to establish NOAMI. As a Naval Chief, he was very much interested in the exploration of the Ocean for utilization of the Ocean Resources, which are very important for the sustainability of human beings and other living beings and the blue economy. He used to know that the Ocean would be a great source of food and resources if explored properly and it would ensure food security. He himself was the Ocean of knowledge in respect of the Ocean, seasonal changes of weather related to ocean movement, and meteorology. He was the source of inspiration for NOAMI for his selfless and meritorious services and used to advise for the betterment of this institute.

Autobiography 
In his autobiography "Memoir of M.H. Khan: Turbulence in the Indian Subcontinent", he tells his story and reflects on issues vital to his country, from religion and education to shipping, fishing and international relations.

References

1932 births
2018 deaths
Bangladeshi Navy admirals
Chiefs of Naval Staff (Bangladesh)
Pakistan Navy officers
Place of birth missing
Bangladesh Krishak Sramik Awami League central committee members